Nickolas M. Kotik (born 1950) is a former Democratic member of the Pennsylvania House of Representatives.

Kotik holds a bachelor's degree in public administration from Indiana University of Pennsylvania. He spent over 20 years working for Allegheny County as a payroll accountant and property assessor. Kotik later worked as an aide to his predecessor, Representative Fred Trello, and as manager of Robinson Township.

References

External links
Pennsylvania House of Representatives - Nick Kotik (Democrat) official PA House website
Pennsylvania House Democratic Caucus - Nick Kotik official Party website

Living people
1950 births
Democratic Party members of the Pennsylvania House of Representatives
21st-century American politicians
American people of Hungarian descent